Denise may refer to:

 Denise (given name), people with the given name Denise 
 Denise (computer chip), a video graphics chip from the Amiga computer
 "Denise" (song), a 1963 song by Randy & the Rainbows
 Denise, Mato Grosso, a municipality in Brazil
 Denise, an 1885 play by Alexander Dumas fils
 SP-350 Denise, a small submarine also known as the "Diving saucer"
 A brand name of desogestrel

See also
 Hurricane Denise, a list of tropical cyclones named Denise
 Saint Denise (disambiguation)

Denice (disambiguation)
Denyse, a given name